Aucanquilcha is a massive stratovolcano located in the Antofagasta Region of northern Chile, just west of the border with Bolivia and within the Alto Loa National Reserve. The volcano is embedded in a larger cluster of volcanoes known as the Aucanquilcha cluster. This cluster of volcanoes was formed in stages over eleven million years of activity with varying magma output, including lava domes and lava flows. Aucanquilcha volcano proper is formed from four units that erupted between 1.04–0.23 million years ago. During the ice ages, both the principal Aucanquilcha complex and the other volcanoes of the cluster were subject to glaciation, resulting in the formation of moraines and cirques.

The cluster has generated lava ranging in composition from andesite to dacite, with the main volcano being exclusively of dacitic composition. Systematic variations in temperature, crystal and biotite content have been recorded during the evolution of the cluster.

At Aucanquilcha volcano there is some fumarolic activity, and sulfur deposits are found at the summit. Several sulfur mines lie in the complex. It was the world's highest mine during that period. Originally, sulfur obtained at the mine was transported down with llamas. Subsequently, an aerial cableway was employed to transport the sulfur to the town of Amincha. To bring the sulfur down, a road network to the summit was constructed in 1972, although it is now impassable.

Geography and geology

Regional setting 

Aucanquilcha is part of the Central Volcanic Zone (CVZ) of the Andes, a highly silicic volcanic zone in South America. The arc has migrated eastward towards the high Andes from the Pacific Ocean coast since the Jurassic.

The Aucanquilcha complex lies northwest of the Altiplano–Puna volcanic complex (APVC), a local large igneous province. The Aucanquilcha complex is much smaller volumetrically than the APVC ignimbrites, but the duration of activity and the location indicate that Aucanquilcha is a subcomponent of the APVC complex.

The long-term magma output of Aucanquilcha is comparable to the magma output of other long-term active volcanoes in the central Andes such as Ollagüe and Llullaillaco. In all such cases, an early peak in magma output is followed by later lower-volume activity (followed by ). Unzen in Japan and Mount Duff and Lassen Peak in California have similar eruption histories. Such decreases may occur because of the lithostatic load imposed by the edifices on the magma chambers and the increased travel distance of the magma through the edifice.

Local setting 

Aucanquilcha is part of a cluster of volcanoes located between the Rio Loa and the Chile–Bolivia border. The maximum slope of the summit area is 25°. During the Cumbre Negra stage, a pyroclastic flow occurred on the northwestern side of the volcano. It was at first identified as a debris avalanche, but the lack of hummocky topography and the presence of large juvenile blocks identify it as a pyroclastic flow. One block in the flow and the lava dome from which the flow originated have been dated at 0.6 mya. It is likely that two small lava domes (Cerro Cumbre Negra and Summit 5867) on the northwest flank occupy flank vents. To the north lies the 3.3 mya old andesite Cerro Tres Monos ridge; to the west lies the east-west Cerro Polan and La Luna ridge.

On its southern side lies the Cerro Chela volcano. Its volcanoes are arranged in north-south and northwestern alignments, which may indicate a rupture of the crust above shallow magma reservoirs.

Aucanquilcha underwent a northwestward flank collapse, generating a debris avalanche deposit. The flow was channeled between Miño Volcano and Cerro Cumbre Negra (an eroded lava massif) towards the dry Rio Loa valley, favouring the preservation of the slide deposit. The proximal parts of the slide are covered by younger eruptive products and also by moraines, indicating that the slide was followed by at least one glacial episode. The slide lacks the hummocky topography usually found on debris avalanches but has radial ridges and grooves. Another landslide occurred during the Redondo stage on the eastern side of the main volcano into the Salar de Carcote.

Petrographically, the composition of the cluster ranges from andesite to dacite with SiO2 ranging from 62.8% to 65.7%. Andesites appear as lava flows while dacites form lava domes and dome complexes. The rocks from the main Aucanquilcha volcano are uniformly dacitic and show little evidence of temporal variation in their composition. Potassium content ranges from 1.5 to 4%. Plagioclase is the dominant component of the magma. Clinopyroxene+orthopyroxene+amphibole (hornblende and pargasite) or amphibole+biotite+minor amounts of pyroxene are subordinate components. Apatite, ilmenite, magnetite and zircon can also be found. There is evidence of magma mixing and mingling.

Rocks have a porphyritic texture. Basaltic andesites typically contain less than 10% crystals while dacites generally have more than 20% crystals. The Alconcha group lavas of the first one million years are crystal-poor and lack biotite; later lavas contain biotite and more crystals. Based on geothermometric data, the highest temperatures occurred during phases of high activity and lower temperatures are associated with low output periods. It is likely that crustal feedback and increased deep crustal influx of mantle-derived basalts drive increased magmatic flux. During the time of the Polan eruption on the west flank, magma output was spatially segregated with the peripheral Miño Volcano generating andesite lavas and the more central volcanos generating dacites.

Various parts of the main volcano have been subjected to hydrothermal alteration. The Azufrera stage edifice was subject to the most alteration; especially in the summit area and between the Angulo and Azufrera summits lie sulfur rich talus deposits. The central part of the complex is heavily altered by fumarole activity. Hydrothermal alteration may be driven by the formation of a deep magma reservoir and resulting hydrothermal circulation in overlying rocks.

Eruptive history 
Eruption rates increased 6 million years ago, coinciding with magmas becoming more uniform in composition and the onset of strong hydrothermal alteration. It is possible that solidification of magmas below the volcano insulated the feeding channels from heat loss and caused the temperatures in the system to increase. The 10-million-year duration of activity of the Altiplano–Puna volcanic complex systems is comparable to the duration of Aucanquilcha activity. The age of the lava flows ranges from heavily glaciated andesite flows overlying less-eroded ones to possibly postglacial lava flows that may be tens of thousands of years old.

Aucanquilcha cluster 

The Aucanquilcha cluster formed in four stages, each corresponding to a group. The Alconcha group, with seven volcanoes, is constructed from pyroxene, andesite and dacite and formed 11–8 mya. It is constructed from two northern composite cones, Alconcha and Volcan Tuco (also known as Cerro Garage, dated 10.96–10.51 mya), and five lava domes on the northeastern side of the cluster. Alconcha has a large breach on the southern side of its crater that is likely the product of a flank collapse but the avalanche deposit may be buried beneath younger material. Lavas within the breach are dated 10.78–10.43 mya. The centres of Volcan Tuco and Alconcha are heavily eroded, and Alconcha's lavas and scoria lie on top of Tuco. While the vent location is unknown, the composition of the ignimbrite, and its dating and distribution, indicate an association with this group. The domes are poorly researched, with the Coscalito dome dated 8.9–8.7 mya and Cerro Amincha 8.01.

The Gordo group, which erupted 6–4 mya following a probable 2-million-year hiatus, is located in the southern and western parts of the cluster. Cerro Gordo itself (5.49 mya) has a crater that is breached westwards, exposing about twelve radial dykes but with no trace of a debris avalanche. One of the larger centres of the cluster, Gordo is associated with a lava field on its western side that is dated 4.9 mya. Cerro Puquíos and Cerro Negro (5.81–5.28 mya) lie on the southern side of the cluster, and glacial cirques cutting their northeastern flanks reveal layers of scoria and lavas. Puquíos has an amphitheatre structure on its western side. Paco Paco (4.41–4.27 mya) is located north of most Gordo group volcanoes. Volcan Pabellón (4.14–4.12 mya) sits southwest of the Puquíos-Negro ridge. The Las Bolitas lava field (5.23–5.13 mya) is associated with the Gordo group but the vent locations are unknown.

The 3.6–2.3 mya Polan group, with ten dispersed volcanoes including Miño Volcano, is the largest group in the cluster and includes Tres Monos, La Luna, Cerro Polan, Chaihuiri, Miño Volcano and the lavas of the Aucanquilcha platform. Cerro Polan's (3.5–3 mya) eastern side is deeply dissected, and the exposed materials are heavily altered in the deeper sections. Lava fields to Polan's west and southwest (2.6 mya on one western field) are associated with it. La Luna (2.97–2.57) lies just east of Polan; these two volcanoes were probably one volcano in the past. La Luna has a lava dome surrounded by a glaciated but unaltered lava table. Hydrothermal alteration has affected some lavas and pyroclastics from Tres Monos, and the western side has lateral and terminal moraines. The Aucanquilcha platform (3.6–2.7 mya) sits underneath the main Aucanquilcha volcano, and its lava mostly flowed north. Its southern side is a  table with one hill, Cerro Campana, dated to 3.3 mya. The platform presumably forms one third of the total volume of the Aucanquilcha cluster and may have originated from a part of the ridge of the La Luna-Polan trend, now buried beneath Aucanquilcha. Chaihuiri (2.39 mya) is a lava dome with moraines and two short lava flows; it is the youngest Polan group volcano.

After the four main phases, some scoria cones of basaltic composition, including Poruñita and Luna de Tierra, formed between Aucanquilcha and Ollagüe.

Aucanquilcha proper 

The main Aucanquilcha volcano formed in four stages. Between 1.04–0.92 mya the bulk of the volcano formed in the Azufrera stage. A vent at  altitude fed most of this edifice; a second vent on the northern flank at the  summit generated three lava flows, two shorter ones and a long one to the northwest. These flows are moderately altered and have oxidation rinds. There is little evidence of explosive activity, but it may have been obscured by glacial erosion. This volcano was probably an isolated cone, but the existence of a previous stage cannot be excluded.

The second stage, named Rodado, lasted from 0.95 to 0.85 mya. It formed on the eastern slopes of the Azufrera volcano, with one vent at the  summit. Rodado stage lavas are blocky and platy and usually thicker than Azufrera stage lavas. Some of the summit vent lavas are among the most vesicular of this stage. They are also less weathered (oxidation rinds are c.  thick) and less subject to solfataric alteration. The Cerro Chinchillas lavas are the oldest of this stage; erupted from an unknown vent, they lack amphiboles. A flank collapse, possibly triggered by a large earthquake, occurred during this stage.

The third stage is the Cumbre Negra stage, named after the westernmost summit and principal vent of this stage, Cerro Cumbre Negra. The time course of its activity is less defined than the previous two stages; it may have occurred between 1–0.47 mya, but most likely 0.6–0.5 mya based on potassium–argon dating. Four lava flows derived from the main vent, all less than one kilometre long and  thicker than previous stages. They all have hydration rinds but no native sulfur deposits. This stage generated Aucanquilcha's only pyroclastic flow during a lava dome collapse as occurred on Merapi in Indonesia.

The youngest stage, known as Angulo, lasted from 0.66 to 0.24 mya. It was centered between the Azufrera and Rodado stage edifices 0.35–0.23 mya. One crater on the northeast side of the ridge fed lavas to the north. One of the oldest flows has been compared in length to the 50% longer Chao Dacite flow but is much thinner. The flows from this stage are weakly weathered and partially overlie glacial deposits.

There is no evidence of Holocene activity but the volcano has active fumaroles though the low-temperature fumaroles are not visible through short wavelength infrared data from satellites. Fumarole activity was observed in 1962 and is most conspicuous in the trenches dug during sulfur mining operations. Lava flow emissions and minor explosive activity, confined to the edifice of the volcano, are the most important risks from renewed activity.

Glaciation and hydrology 
The volcano is currently not glaciated despite its height, due to the aridity of the climate. The Quebrada de Chaigüire valley originates at the foot of Aucanquilcha. Some of the source springs of the Rio Loa are on Aucanquilcha and it drains the western and northwestern sides of the volcano; the eastern side drains into the Salar de Ollagüe salt pan, the northeastern into the Salar de Laguani, and the southeastern into the Salar de Carcote. Most valleys only intermittently transport water, if at all, but it forms the headwaters of the Rio Loa.

The volcanic cluster was modestly glaciated during the Quaternary, as evidenced by glacial striations and moraines at elevations above , and shows evidence of glaciers both on the main volcano and its subsidiaries. At least two distinct glacier stages took place. The western Azufrera edifice was heavily glaciated in the past. At least three moraine stages have been mapped on that edifice, and on its southern side is found a modest cirque with glacially polished lavas on the floor. The Rodado stage edifice has several moraine stages on its southern slopes. Another small cirque with a moraine has been found in the northeastern side of the Cerro Cumbre Negra summit next to an Azufrera stage lava flow. A small moraine lies on the south side of the Angulo edifice; some lavas from that edifice overlie glacial deposits.

Human activity and mining 

A famous mine at  altitude that yielded ore with 30% sulfur was opened by Julian B. Carrasco in 1913, who subsequently established the Compañía Minera y Azufrera Carrasco S.A in 1933, first at Ollagüe and after 1950 in Amincha. The sulfur was transported down first with llamas, later through an aerial cableway system from El Ángulo station to Amincha station and finally by trucks. The sulfur was then transported to Chuquicamata to be converted into sulfuric acid or to Antofagasta to be shipped. The mine was active from 1950 to 1992. In 1977 other sulfur mines were present to the west between Cerro Polan and Cerro Gordo and south of the main Aucanquilcha massif. The last reported mining activity on the mountain was in 1994 and during the 1990s the worker camps were abandoned. 

The cableway, of which ruins are still standing, runs from the mine to a mining camp and from there to Amincha where the sulfur was refined during the 1950s. The road leading up to the mine is dated 1972 and is now impassable because of rock falls.

Covellite and other copper sulfides found in the area appear to have formed through postvolcanic epithermal mineralization above deep porphyry copper mineralization.

Altitude and habitation 
The expedition found that an even higher abandoned village at  existed, but miners refused to live there. The conclusion taken from the expedition was that  was the highest habitable altitude.

West in 1986 reported that a few miners permanently lived in the mine area. One of them reportedly had spent two years there. These are considered to be the highest human inhabitants on Earth. Research performed on Aymara miners of the Aucanquilcha mine indicates that they are fully acclimatized to the altitude, with less hyperventilation and higher hemoglobin than acclimatized people from lower areas. Their families are born and raised at lower altitudes, however.

See also 

 List of volcanoes in Chile

References

Further reading 

 
 
  (in Spanish; also includes volcanoes of Argentina, Bolivia, and Peru)
 
  (includes description and photos of Aucanquilcha summit road and mine)

Volcanoes of Antofagasta Region
Mountains of Chile
Stratovolcanoes of Chile
Extinct volcanoes
Miocene stratovolcanoes
Pliocene stratovolcanoes
Pleistocene stratovolcanoes
Neogene Chile
Pleistocene Chile
Andean Volcanic Belt
Six-thousanders of the Andes
Sulfur mines